Luka Petrovski (born October 20, 1996) is a Macedonian professional basketball shooting guard for Kožuv. He was also member of U-18 Macedonia national basketball team

His father Slobodan Petrovski was also a basketball player.

External links

References

1996 births
Living people
Macedonian men's basketball players
Shooting guards
Sportspeople from Skopje